Gonbadbardi may refer to:
 Gonbadbardi-ye Olya
 Gonbadbardi-ye Sofla